Iuliana Cantaragiu (born 2 July 1975) was the Minister of Environment of the Republic of Moldova.

Note

1975 births
Living people
Politicians from Chișinău
Government ministers of Moldova
Women government ministers of Moldova
Environment ministers
21st-century Moldovan politicians
21st-century Moldovan women politicians